Daniel Nestor and Nenad Zimonjić were the defending champions, but lost in the second round to Pablo Cuevas and Juan Mónaco.
Bob Bryan and Mike Bryan defeated their compatriots John Isner and Sam Querrey in the final. They won 6–2, 6–3.

Seeds
All seeds receive a bye into the second round.

Draw

Finals

Top half

Bottom half

References
 Doubles Draw

Men's Doubles
Italian Open - Doubles